Protein CXorf40A is a protein that in humans is encoded by the CXorf40A gene.

References

External links

Further reading

Uncharacterized proteins